Vurgun may refer to:

Samad Vurgun, writer
Vurğun, Azerbaijan
Vurgun (web series), a Turkish series